NLRP1 encodes NACHT, LRR, FIIND, CARD domain and PYD domains-containing protein 1 in humans. NLRP1 was the first protein shown to form an inflammasome. NLRP1 is expressed by a variety of cell types, which are predominantly epithelial or hematopoietic. The expression is also seen within glandular epithelial structures including the lining of the small intestine, stomach, airway epithelia and in hairless or glabrous skin. NLRP1 polymorphisms are associated with skin extra-intestinal manifestations in CD. Its highest expression was detected in human skin, in psoriasis and in vitiligo. Polymorphisms of NLRP1 were found in lupus erythematosus and diabetes type 1. Variants of mouse NLRP1 were found to be activated upon N-terminal cleavage by the protease in anthrax lethal factor.

Function 

This gene encodes a member of the Ced-4 family of apoptosis proteins. Ced-family members contain a caspase recruitment domain (CARD) and are known to be key mediators of programmed cell death. The encoded protein contains a distinct N-terminal pyrin-like motif, which is possibly involved in protein-protein interactions. The NLRP1 protein interacts strongly with caspase 2 and weakly with caspase 9. Overexpression of this gene was demonstrated to induce pyroptosis in cells. Multiple alternatively spliced transcript variants encoding distinct isoforms have been found for this gene, but the biological validity of some variants has not been determined.

Mechanism of activation 
NLRP1 activates an antibacterial or antiviral immune response. Antibacterial immune response compensates for the loss of the MAP kinase response. Humans produce NLRP1, but human NLRP1 is not activated by lethal factor. NLRP1 could be activated by proteolytic cleavage resulting in the removal of an auto-inhibitory PYD and release of the CARD domain, responsible for the recruitment and activation of pro-caspase-1 in the active form of caspase-1. Human NLRP1 activation can be elicited by several means including enteroviral 3C proteases. Its function in immunity is just beginning to be understood.

Interactions 

NLRP1 has been shown to interact with caspase 9 and APAF1. Via its FIIND domain, NLRP1 interacts directly with DPP9 and DPP8 which are needed to prevent NLRP1 activation.

Loss of DPP9 in humans and mice, results in NLRP1 activation.

Variants of NLRP1 in human 
As published by Bruno Reversade and colleagues several Mendelian diseases caused by NLRP1 germline mutations have been described. These include Multiple Self-healing Palmoplantar Carcinoma , familial Nikam's disease and Autoinflammation with Arthritis and Dyskeratosis.
Mutations in NLRP1, whether dominant or recessive, tend to be gain-of-function alleles that trigger inflammasome signaling with IL1B and IL18 release.

Variants of NLRP1 in mice 
Mice have three paralogs of the Nlrp1 gene (Nlrp1a, b, c). Nlrp1c is a pseudogene. Mouse NLRP1B is not activated by a receptor-ligand type mechanism. NLRP1B variants from certain inbred mouse strains, BALB/c and 129, can be activated by the lethal factor (LF) protease. The lethal factor protease is produced and secreted by Bacillus anthracis, the agent of anthrax. Together with protective antigen (PA), LF forms a bipartite toxin, Lethal Toxin. The role of PA is to form a translocation channel that delivers LF into the host cell cytosol, where LF play roles in immune response by cleaving and inactivating  MAP kinases. LF also directly cleaves NLRP1B proximal to its N-terminus, it is necessary and sufficient for NLRP1B inflammasome formation and CASP1 activation. Activation of NLRP1B-dependent inflammasome responses appears in host defense with mechanism like IL-1β and neutrophils. NLRP1B can function as a sensor of bacterial proteases, immune responses are specifically activated by virulence factors.

It is not clear what stimuli might activate NLRP1A, the other known functional murine NLRP1 paralog. The study identified a mouse carrying a missense gain-of-function mutation in NLRP1A (Q593P) that active inflammasome responses. The mechanism of wild-type NLRP1A activation is unclear.

References

Further reading

External links 
 

LRR proteins
NOD-like receptors